George Schenck is an American screenwriter. His credits include Futureworld, the TV-movie The Phantom of Hollywood and numerous episodes of NCIS.

He also had a production company Schenck/Cardea Productions, which at one time, in the 1980s, was affiliated with Columbia Pictures Television.

Schenck became an executive producer during NCIS season nine. As of October 4, 2016, Schenck had written 43 episodes of NCIS. Schenck and Frank Cardea were named co-showrunners in October 2016 following the death of Gary Glasberg.

References

External links

American male screenwriters
American television writers
American television producers
Living people
American male television writers
NCIS (franchise)
1942 births